Mackell is a surname. Notable people with the surname include:

Fleming Mackell (1929–2015), Canadian ice hockey player
Jack Mackell (1896–1961), Canadian ice hockey player
Thomas J. Mackell (1914–1992), American lawyer and politician

See also
Mackall
Mackel